Anna Pavignano is an Italian screenwriter born in 1955 in Borgomanero. She is best known for her screenplay for the movie Il postino and Ricomincio da tre. She was the partner in life and career of Massimo Troisi from 1977 to 1987.

Career 
Pavignano has been writing for several years before she really begins her professional career. She studied psychology at University of Turin and worked on television show to pay for her study. In 1977, she meets the actor, director and screenwriter Massimo Troisi on the set of the show Non Stop. Her professional career begins with him and on a personal aspect, she found love in Troisi.

Their first film together is Ricomincio da tre in 1981 which was nominated for Best Screenplay at the David di Donatello Awards. They wrote Scusate il ritardo in 1983 nominated for several awards for acting. In 1983, they wrote the film Le vie del Signore sono finite which was nominated for Best Screenplay at the Italian National Syndicate of Film Journalist. Their relation ended in 1987, but they kept working together until the death of Troisi. Their major accomplishment was the film Il Postino in 1994. Tragically, just 12 hours after the end of the shooting of the film, Massimo Troisi died of a heart attack. The movie won several awards and was nominated in many categories as well. The film was nominated for the Oscar of Best Writing, Screenplay Based on Material Previously Produced or Published. It was also nominated for Best Screenplay - Adapted at the BAFTA Awards.

After the end of the relation with Troisi, Pavignano continued her career, working with other writers. She then wrote Passi d'amore in 1989. She wrote by herself the film Ma non per sempre in 1991. In 2002, she wrote the screenplay for the film Casomai and was nominated for a David di Donatello Awards for Best Screenplay.

She also starts writing books in 2007. She starts with the book Da domani mi alzo tardi talking about her past relationship with Massimo Troisi. It is a novel using her life as a subject making it a bit of a biography.

Bibliography 
 2007: Da domani mi alzo tardi 
 2009: In bilico sul mare

Filmography 
 Collaborative 
 1981: Ricomincio da tre, directed by Massimo Troisi
 1982: Morto Troisi, viva Troisi!, directed by Massimo Troisi
 1983: Scusate il ritardo, directed by Massimo Troisi 
 1987: Le vie del Signore sono finite, directed by Massimo Troisi 
 1989: Passi d'amore, directed by Sergio Sollima
 1991: Pensavo fosse amore, invece era un calesse, directed by Massimo Troisi 
 1994: Il postino, directed by Michael Radford
 2001: Malafemmene, directed by Fabio Conversi 
 2002: Casomai, directed by Alessandro D'Alatri 
 2002: Amore con la S maiuscola, directed by Paolo Costella 
 2004: Se devo essere sincera, directed by Davide Ferrario 
 2010: Sul mare, directed by Alessandro D'Alatri 
 2013: Something good: The Mercury Factor, directed by Luca Barbareschi 
 2014: Elsa & Fred, directed by Michael Radford
 2023: Massimo Troisi: Somebody Down There Likes Me, directed by Mario Martone

Non-Collaborative
 1991: Ma non per sempre, directed by Marzio Casa

Awards

References 

1955 births
Living people
Italian screenwriters
Italian women screenwriters
People from Borgomanero